The Quoeech were a Native American group who lived in southern Nevada.  When missionaries of the Church of Jesus Christ of Latter-day Saints first went to Las Vegas in 1855 they were contacted by Quoeech who lived at some distance from Las Vegas.  Some of the Quoeech were later baptized.  They were also known as the Diggers.

Identification 
People who belong to the Quoeech are known as the Quechan.  They are alternatively known as Yuma. They are familiar as California Indian people of the fertile Colorado River valley who share a few of the traditions of the Southwest Indians. The Quoeech used to reside at riverside hamlets. The houses built with log frameworks covered with sand, brush, or wattle and daub were among the structures they made. The word Quechan means ‘the people who descended by way of the water’.

Demography 
In 1540, the population count of the Quoeech was about 4,000 before their contact with the Spaniards. The count reduced and reached around 1000 around the early 1900s. Their population was about 2000 in 1988, around two-thirds of the Quoeech used to live on or close to the reservation.

Economy 
The Quoeech are mainly an agriculture community. They own thousands of acres of agricultural land which they give on lease to Indian and non-Indian farmers. Their seasons include hot summer and less cold winter. The tribe own 5 trailers and RV parks. They have a tribal police department and court system. The community also has 1 grocery store, museum, casino, utility company, a fish and game department, and a Seasonal parking lot in Andrade, CA. Besides agricultural use, and the sand and gravel operation, the augment of its economy counts on tourism and related businesses to tourism. In accordance with the most recently collected data of the Tribal Enrollment Office, the count of population of the Quoeech is 2475.

Linguistic Affiliation 
Quechan language came from the Yuman sub-branch of the Hokan language family. But the members of the Quoeech tribe who live in the far southern parts of their area might have used a different dialect of the language.

References

Sources
https://web.archive.org/web/20080206055823/http://www.nevadaobserver.com/Reading%20Room%20Documents/History%20of%20Las%20Vegas%20Mission%202%20(1926).htm 
http://freepages.genealogy.rootsweb.ancestry.com/~eaglesnest/Histories/george-bean.html

Native American tribes in Nevada